[./Https://www.facebook.com/boussit.zgharta.5 Bousit], or Boussit is a village in Zgharta District, in the Northern Governorate of Lebanon.

The population are Greek Orthodox.

It's well known for the cultivation of wheat and olives.
Altitude: 800 m from sea level.
First mayor: Naiim sayed El khoury.

Current Mayor: Nabih Jamil El Khoury

Known persons of the town :
Hanna Jamil El Khoury : Entrepreneur - Lebanon, Romania, KSA,
Gilbert Hanna El Khoury : Engineering Contractor - KSA, 
Samir Jamil El Khoury : Manager and Contractor at LBCI, 
Serge El Khoury : Architect
Naiim Sayed El khoury : Barrister, 
Samir El Khoury JR. : Prof.Computer Engineering, Director of the higher orthodox vocational institute , Suzanne Mansour Al Khoury, Notairy public of Zouk Mikael

References

External links
Ehden Family Tree 

Populated places in the North Governorate
Zgharta District
Eastern Orthodox Christian communities in Lebanon